This article contains information about the literary events and publications of 1965.

Events
February 10 – Soviet fiction writers Yuli Daniel and Andrei Sinyavsky are sentenced to five and seven years, respectively, for "anti-Soviet" writings.
February 20 – While Soviet author and translator Valery Tarsis is abroad, the Soviet Union negates his citizenship.
March 26 – Harold Pinter's play The Homecoming receives its world première at the New Theatre, Cardiff, from the Royal Shakespeare Company under Peter Hall. Its London première follows on June 3 at the Aldwych Theatre, with Vivien Merchant, Pinter's wife at this time, appearing. It also appears in print this year.
May 26 – The world première of A High Wind in Jamaica, a film from Richard Hughes's 1929 novel, featuring the future novelist Martin Amis, son of Kingsley Amis, as a teenage actor.
June 11 – International Poetry Incarnation, a performance poetry event, takes place at London's Royal Albert Hall before an audience of 7,000, with members of the Beat Generation featuring. Adrian Mitchell reads "To Whom It May Concern".
June 17 – The London première of Frank Marcus' farce The Killing of Sister George (at the Duke of York's Theatre) is among the first mainstream British plays with lesbian characters. Beryl Reid plays the title rôle. It has been previewed in April at the Bristol Old Vic.
June 19 – J. D. Salinger's novella "Hapworth 16, 1924" takes up most of an issue of The New Yorker magazine dated today. It will be the last of his works published before his death in 2010.
June 30 – The English novelists Kingsley Amis and Elizabeth Jane Howard marry at Marylebone register office in London, as his second marriage and her third.
November 10 – Chinese critic Yao Wenyuan publishes a review of a Beijing Opera production of Wu Han's Hai Rui Dismissed from Office in the Shanghai daily newspaper Wenhui Bao, claiming the drama to be counter-revolutionary, a starting point for the Cultural Revolution in China.
unknown dates
After the text of Heiner Müller's play Der Bau (Construction Site) is published in Sinn und Form, authorities in East Germany prevent a stage première until 1980.
The Nebula Award is conceived by Lloyd Biggle, Jr. The first award will be made next year to Frank Herbert's Dune.
The National Library of New Zealand is formed by merging the Alexander Turnbull Library, the National Library Service and the General Assembly Library under the National Library Act of this year.

New books

Fiction
Lloyd Alexander – The Black Cauldron
Cécile Aubry – Belle et Sébastien
J. G. Ballard – The Drought 
John Bingham – A Fragment of Fear
Ray Bradbury – The Vintage Bradbury
John Brunner
The Martian Sphinx as Keith Woodcott
The Squares of the City
Kenneth Bulmer – Land Beyond the Map
Edgar Rice Burroughs – Tarzan and the Castaways
Victor Canning – The Whip Hand
John Dickson Carr – The House at Satan's Elbow
Agatha Christie – At Bertram's Hotel
L. Sprague de Camp
The Arrows of Hercules
The Spell of Seven (ed.)
August Derleth – The Casebook of Solar Pons
Philip K. Dick – The Three Stigmata of Palmer Eldritch
Margaret Drabble – The Millstone
Ian Fleming – The Man with the Golden Gun
Margaret Forster – Georgy Girl
Witold Gombrowicz – Kosmos
Richard Gordon – Love and Sir Lancelot
Winston Graham – After the Act
Graham Greene – The Comedians
Frank Herbert – Dune
Arthur Hailey – Hotel
James Leo Herlihy - Midnight Cowboy
Bohumil Hrabal – Ostře sledované vlaky (Closely Observed Trains)
Bel Kaufman – Up the Down Staircase
Danilo Kiš – Garden, Ashes (Bašta, pepeo)
Pierre Klossowski – Le Baphomet
Jerzy Kosinski – The Painted Bird
John le Carré – The Looking-Glass War
J. M. G. Le Clézio – Le Livre des fuites
David Lodge – The British Museum Is Falling Down
H. P. Lovecraft – Dagon and Other Macabre Tales
John D. MacDonald – A Deadly Shade of Gold
Compton Mackenzie – The Stolen Soprano
Norman Mailer – An American Dream
Eric Malpass – Morning's at Seven
James A. Michener – The Source
Gladys Mitchell – Pageant of Murder
Mudrooroo (also as Colin Johnson) – Wild Cat Falling
Iris Murdoch – The Red and the Green
Ngũgĩ wa Thiong'o (also as James Ngigi) – The River Between
Peter O'Donnell – Modesty Blaise
J. B. Priestley – Lost Empires
Raymond Queneau – Les fleurs bleues
Françoise Sagan – La Chamade
Ernst von Salomon – Die schöne Wilhelmine
Muriel Spark – The Mandelbaum Gate
Vincent Starrett – The Quick and the Dead (collection)
Irving Stone – Those Who Love
Rex Stout – The Doorbell Rang
Julian Symons – The Belting Inheritance
Benjamin Tammuz – חיי אליקום (Hayei Elyakum, The Life of Elyakum)
Jesús Torbado – Las corrupciones
Jack Vance – Space Opera
Erico Verissimo – O Senhor Embaixador
Arved Viirlaid – Sadu jõkke (Rain for the River)
Ion Vinea – Lunatecii (The Lunatics, posthumous)
Stephen Vizinczey – In Praise of Older Women: the amorous recollections of András Vajda
Kurt Vonnegut – God Bless You, Mr. Rosewater
Donald Wandrei – Strange Harvest
Marguerite Young – Miss MacIntosh, My Darling

Children and young people
Rev. W. Awdry – Very Old Engines (twentieth in The Railway Series of 42 books by him and his son Christopher Awdry)
Kir Bulychov – A Girl Nothing Can Happen To, the first work of literature about Alisa Selezneva
Thora Colson  – Rinkin of Dragon's Wood
Susan Cooper – Over Sea, Under Stone (first in the Dark is Rising sequence of five books)
Ruth Manning-Sanders – A Book of Dragons
Ruth Park – The Muddle-Headed Wombat in the Treetops
Bill Peet
Chester the Worldly Pig
Kermit the Hermit
John Rowe Townsend – Widdershins Crescent

Drama
Alan Ayckbourn – Relatively Speaking (as Meet my Father)
Samuel Beckett – Come and Go
Edward Bond – Saved
David Halliwell – Little Malcolm And His Struggle Against The Eunuchs
John B. Keane – The Field
Frank Marcus – The Killing of Sister George
Sławomir Mrożek – Tango
John Osborne – A Patriot for Me
Nelson Rodrigues – Toda Nudez Será Castigada (All Nudity Shall Be Punished)
Michel Tremblay – Les Belles-Sœurs
Charles Wood – Meals on Wheels

Poetry

Stanley McNail – Something Breathing
Sylvia Plath (suicide 1963) – Ariel
Clark Ashton Smith – Poems in Prose

Non-fiction
Dean Acheson – Morning and Noon
Nelson Algren – Notes from a Sea Diary: Hemingway All the Way (travel book)
Dmitri Borgmann – Language on Vacation
Nirad C. Chaudhuri – The Continent of Circe
Allen G. Debus – The English Paracelsians.
Richard Feynman – The Character of Physical Law
Barney Glaser and Anselm Strauss – Awareness of Dying
William Golding – The Hot Gates
Alex Haley and Malcolm X – The Autobiography of Malcolm X
Pauline Kael – I Lost It at the Movies
Peter Laslett – The World We Have Lost: England before the Industrial Age
H. P. Lovecraft – Selected Letters I (1911–1924)
P. J. Marshall – The Impeachment of Warren Hastings
Robin Moore – The Green Berets
Ralph Nader - Unsafe at Any Speed: The Designed-In Dangers of the American Automobile
Tamara Talbot Rice – Ancient Arts of Central AsiaTom Wolfe – The Kandy-Kolored Tangerine-Flake Streamline BabyBirths
February 1 – Louise Welsh, British writer of psychological thrillers
February 20 – Philip Hensher, English fiction writer, critic and editor
March 4
Andrew Collins, English journalist and scriptwriter
Anisul Hoque, Bangladeshi novelist, dramatist and journalist
March 30 – Piers Morgan, English journalist and editor
May 14 - Eoin Colfer, Irish children's books author
June 2 – Sean Stewart, American-Canadian author
July 7 – Zoë Heller, English novelist
July 31 – J. K. Rowling, English children's novelist
August 1 – Sam Mendes, English theatre and film director
September 29 – Nikolaj Frobenius, Norwegian novelist
October 23 – Augusten Burroughs, American memoirist
November 28 – Erwin Mortier, Belgian poet, novelist and translator writing in Flemish/Dutch
November 29 – Lauren Child, English children's fiction writer and illustrator
December 14 – Helle Helle, Danish novelist
December 31 – Nicholas Sparks, American novelistunknown datesPatience Agbabi, British performance poet
Mike McCormack, Irish fiction writer
Keith Mansfield, English novelist and publisher
Yishai Sarid, Israeli novelist and lawyer
Charlotte Wood, Australian novelist

Deaths
January 4 – T. S. Eliot, American-born English poet and dramatist (born 1888)
January 12 – Lorraine Hansberry, American journalist and dramatist (cancer, born 1930)
March 13 – Fan S. Noli, Albanian bishop and poet (born 1882)
May 3 – Howard Spring, Welsh-born novelist and writer (born 1889)
May 5 – Edgar Mittelholzer, Guyanese-born novelist (suicide, born 1909)
May 19 – Maria Dąbrowska, Polish novelist, essayist and playwright (born 1889)
June 5
Thornton Burgess, American children's author (born 1874)
Eleanor Farjeon, English children's writer and poet (born 1881)
June 13 – Martin Buber, Austrian-born Jewish philosopher (born 1878)
July 8 – Thomas Sigismund Stribling, American novelist (born 1881)
July 9 – Jacques Audiberti, French Absurdist dramatist, poet and novelist (born 1899)
July 28 – Rampo Edogawa (江戸川 乱歩, Taro Hirai), Japanese author and critic (born 1894)
July 30 – Jun'ichirō Tanizaki (谷崎 潤一郎), Japanese novelist (born 1888)
July 31 – John Metcalfe, English novelist and short story writer (born 1891)
August 1 – Percy Lubbock, English essayist, critic and biographer (born 1879)
August 6 – Aksel Sandemose, Danish novelist (born 1899)
August 8 – Shirley Jackson, American horror novelist and short story writer (born 1916)
August 17 – Jack Spicer, American poet (alcohol-related, born 1925)
September 17 – John Davy Hayward, English literary editor and bibliophile (born 1905)
October 8 – Thomas B. Costain, Canadian popular historian (born 1885)
October 15 – Randall Jarrell, American poet (road accident, born 1914)
October 30 – Arthur Schlesinger, Sr., American historian (born 1888)
November 8 – Dorothy Kilgallen, American journalist (alcohol/drug overdose, born 1913)
November 20 – Katharine Anthony, American biographer (born 1877)
November 24 – Betty Miller, Irish-born Jewish writer (born 1910)
December 16 – W. Somerset Maugham English novelist, dramatist and short story writer (born 1874)

Awards
Nobel Prize for literature – Michail Aleksandrovich Sholokhov

Canada
See 1965 Governor General's Awards for a complete list of winners and finalists for those awards.

France
Prix Goncourt: J. Borel, L'AdorationPrix Médicis: René-Victor Pilhes, La RhubarbeUnited Kingdom
Carnegie Medal for children's literature: Philip Turner, The Grange at High ForceEric Gregory Award: John Fuller, Derek Mahon, Michael Longley, Norman Talbot
Newdigate prize: Peter Jay
James Tait Black Memorial Prize for fiction: Muriel Spark, The Mandelbaum GateJames Tait Black Memorial Prize for biography: Mary Moorman, William Wordsworth: The Later Years 1803–1850Queen's Gold Medal for Poetry: Philip Larkin

United States
American Academy of Arts and Letters Gold Medal for Criticism: Walter Lippmann
Hugo Award: Fritz Leiber, The WandererNebula Award: Frank Herbert, DuneNewbery Medal for children's literature: Maia Wojciechowska, Shadow of a BullPulitzer Prize for Drama: Frank D. Gilroy, The Subject Was RosesPulitzer Prize for Fiction: Shirley Ann Grau – The Keepers Of The HousePulitzer Prize for Poetry: John Berryman: 77 Dream SongsElsewhere
Miles Franklin Award: Thea Astley, The Slow NativesAlfaguara Prize: Jesús Torbado, Las corrupcionesPremio Nadal: E. Cabalero Calderón, El buen salvajeViareggio Prize: Goffredo Parise, Il Padrone'' (The Boss)

References

 
Years of the 20th century in literature